Lamb-Shaffer syndrome is a rare autosomal dominant condition. Less than 40 cases have been reported by 2018.

Signs and symptoms

Clinical features include
 Global developmental delay
 Significant speech delay
 Hypotonia
 Micrognathia
 Scoliosis
 Defects in motor function both fine and gross
 Optic atrophy
 Ocular motor apraxia
 Strabismus
 Frontal bossing
 Ear abnormalities
 Low nasal bridge
 Epicanthal folds
 Midline tongue groove

Genetics

This condition is caused by mutations in the SRY-related HMG-box (SOX5) gene. This gene encodes a protein in the family of transcription factors involved in the regulation of embryonic development and in the determination of the cell fate.

The gene is located on the short arm of chromosome 12 (12p12).

A study published in 2019 examining 34 families shows that 74% (25/34 families) of the condition are likely to be of de novo occurrence as the variants could not be detected in parental blood samples. In 15% (5/34 families) of the patients the condition was likely inherited from a mosaic parent. In 3% (1/34), the condition was inherited from an affected parent. This means that the majority of the patients have parents who are unaffected whereas inheritance is also possible.

Pathogenesis

How this mutation causes the clinical picture is not currently clear.

Diagnosis

The diagnosis may be suspected on the basis of the constellation of clinical features but may only be determined by a genetic test. The full exome sequencing test is used to determine the partial deletion, deletion,or mutation to the SOX5 gene. It is made by sequencing the SOX5 gene responsible for the cells that facilitate information transferring in the brain. Symptoms of Lamb-Shaffer syndrome include fine and gross motor delays, speech delay, global developmental delay,hypotonia and issues with vision, commonly misdiagnosed for autism.

Treatment

There is currently no curative treatment for this condition. Supportive management is all that is currently available.

Epidemiology
This is a rare condition with a prevalence of < 1/106. The total number of cases reported to date is <40.

History

This condition was first described by Lamb et al in 2012

References 

Genetic diseases and disorders
Rare diseases